James or Jim Bowden may refer to:

 James Bowden (footballer) (1880–1951), English footballer
 James Bowden (American football) (born 1973), American football wide receiver
 Jamie Bowden (born 1960), British ambassador
 Jim Bowden (baseball) (born 1961), American baseball analyst and general manager
 Jim Bowden (diver), American diver
 Jim Bowden (rugby league), English rugby league footballer who played in the 1950s